Ambassador automobile may refer to several automobiles:

AMC Ambassador
Austin Ambassador
Hindustan Ambassador
Nash Ambassador
Yellow Cab Ambassador